Chashma Right Bank Irrigation Project (CRBIP) is located at Chashma in Damaan, Punjab, Pakistan.Chashma Right Bank canal off-takes from Chashma Barrage on its right bank and extends south ward up to Tounsa Barrage on Indus River.
Chashma Right Bank Irrigation Canal was constructed to cultivate an area of 606,000 acres out of which, 366,000 acres in Khyber Pakhtunkhwa and 240,000 acres in Punjab.

References

Irrigation in Pakistan
Agriculture in Punjab, Pakistan
Canals in Pakistan